À l'origine  is an album by Benjamin Biolay, released in 2005.

Track listing

2005 albums